Edoardo Vergani (born 6 February 2001) is an Italian professional footballer who plays as a forward for  club Pescara.

Club career

Inter Milan
Vergani joined the youth teams of Inter Milan at the age of 13 and represented the club in the 2018–19 and 2019–20 editions of the UEFA Youth League. He made his debut for Inter's senior squad in July 2019, in a friendly. He was first called up to Inter's senior squad for a competitive game in November 2019 for a game against Verona, but remained on the bench.

Loan to Bologna
On 17 September 2020, he was loaned to Bologna for a season, with an option to purchase.

He made his Serie A debut for Bologna on 5 December 2020 in a game against the club holding his rights, Inter. He substituted Rodrigo Palacio in the 79th minute as Bologna lost 3–1 away.

Salernitana
On 31 August 2021, Vergani signed a two-year contract with Salernitana.

Pescara
On 1 September 2022, Vergani signed with Pescara.

International career
Vergani was first called up to represent Italy for the Under-15 squad in 2016.

At the 2018 UEFA European Under-17 Championship, he scored four goals, including winning goals in the quarter-final and semi-final, as Italy finished as runners-up to Netherlands.

References

External links
 

2001 births
People from Segrate
Footballers from Lombardy
Living people
Italian footballers
Italy youth international footballers
Association football forwards
Inter Milan players
Bologna F.C. 1909 players
U.S. Salernitana 1919 players
Delfino Pescara 1936 players
Serie A players
Sportspeople from the Metropolitan City of Milan